Constantine Gregorievich Kromiadi (1893 – 1990) was a Caucasus Greek-born military officer and anti-communist who served in the Imperial Russian Army, the White Army, later he headed Russian National People's Army and finally commanded the headquarters of the Nazi-collaborating Russian Liberation Army.
In his latter years he was employed by Radio Liberty where Kromiadi also worked with the CIA.

First years

Born in Kars Oblast in 1893, Kromiadi entered service in the Imperial Russian Army as a volunteer and fought during World War I in Persia and also on the Caucasus Front, where many Armenians, Caucasus Greeks, Georgians, and Russians fought against the forces of the Ottoman Empire. During the Russian Civil War Kromiadi joined the White movement, achieving the rank of colonel. After the war he emigrated to Munich where he worked as automobilist.

In Axis army
During World War II, Kromiadi was a Nazi official and a pioneer of the Russian Liberation Movement. In 1942, he headed the Russian National People's Army, an armed unit of Russians, under the pseudonym of Sanin, together with engineer Sonderführer Sergei Ivanov of Russian fascist party. He was relieved by the Germans along with other Russian émigrés, at that time he tried unsuccessfully to take command of another Russian unit, the Druzhina Brigade. The dissolution of the group was heavily influenced with the view of the Slavic people as "Untermenschen" (sub-humans) by the Germans.

Kromiadi became close with captured Soviet general Andrey Vlasov, thus becoming Vlasov's first white émigré ally. In 1943, Vlasov gave Kromiadi command of his headquarters. Kromiadi made several attempts to attract white émigrés to General Vlasov, and was finally successful by the time of the Prague Manifesto, having secured the support of two branches of the Russian Orthodox Church.

Kromiadi's point of view was that the Russian Liberation Army was a 30-year Christian liberation war against Communism.

Radio Free Europe
In 1980, he wrote a book on his experience in the Russian Liberation Movement called For Land, for Freedom..., which was published in San Francisco. He died in 1990 in Munich.

Notes

1893 births
1990 deaths
People from Kars
People from Kars Oblast
Russian people of Greek descent
Russian military personnel of World War I
Counter-revolutionaries
Russian military leaders
Russian collaborators with Nazi Germany
Russian Liberation Army personnel
Russian anti-communists
White Russian emigrants to the United States
Emigrants from the Russian Empire to Germany
White Russian emigrants to Germany